Carl Debrois van Bruyck (14 March 1828 – 15 August 1902)  was an Austrian pianist, composer and music writer.

Life 
Born in Brünn, Mähren, Debrois van Bruyck is primarily known as a special admirer of the composer Robert Schumann. Among other things he set to music poems by his friend Friedrich Hebbel. Debrois van Bruyck presented his autobiography. His written remains can be found in the music and manuscript collection of the Wienbibliothek im Rathaus.

Debrois van Bruyck died in Waidhofen an der Ybbs, Lower Austria at age 74.

Work 
 Technische und ästhetische Analysen des Das Wohltemperierte Klavier, nebst einer allgemeinen, Sebastian Bach und die sogenannte kontrapunktische Kunst betreffende Einleitung. Breitkopf & Härtel, 3rd edition, Leipzig 1925.

Further reading 
 Uwe Harten, Carl Debrois van Bruyck (1828–1902). Leben und Wirken als Musikschriftsteller. Nebst Familienchronik, Kompositions- und Schriftenverzeichnis. Dissertation, Vienna 1974
 , Ein Schumann-Verehrer aus Wien: Carl Debrois van Bruyck (1828–1902), in Schumann-Studien 5 (1996),

References

External links
 Österreichisches Musiklexikon online

Austrian composers
Bach scholars
Austrian classical pianists
Male classical pianists
1828 births
1902 deaths
Musicians from Brno
19th-century Czech male musicians
19th-century musicologists